Sarah Sutherland (born February 18, 1988) is a Canadian-American actress, best known for her role as Catherine Meyer in Veep.

Early life
Sutherland was born in Los Angeles, California, to Kiefer Sutherland and his first wife, Camelia Kath. She is the granddaughter of Canadian actors Donald Sutherland and Shirley Douglas, and great-granddaughter of Canadian politician Tommy Douglas. As a teen, Sutherland trained at the Crossroads Drama Conservatory in Los Angeles, before heading to New York to study at New York University's Tisch School of the Arts. In her final semester, she wrote and acted in a one-woman play, The Skin of a Grape.

Career
Sutherland won a Screen Actors Guild Award for Outstanding Performance by an Ensemble in a Comedy Series for season 6 of Veep.

Filmography

References

External links

Living people
21st-century American actresses
American film actresses
American people of Canadian descent
American people of English descent
American people of German descent
American people of Scottish descent
American television actresses
People from Los Angeles
Sarah
Tisch School of the Arts alumni
Year of birth missing (living people)